Coronel Felipe Varela is a department of the province of La Rioja (Argentina). Its chief town is Villa Unión.

The department is named after Argentine caudillo Felipe Varela.

Settlements 
Aicuña
Banda Florida
Guandacol
Los Palacios
Los Nacimientos
Los Tambillos
Pagancillo
Santa Clara
Villa Unión

References 

Departments of La Rioja Province, Argentina